De Quervain may refer to:

People
 Dominique de Quervain, Swiss neuroscientist
 Fritz de Quervain, Swiss surgeon

Healthcare
 De Quervain syndrome a form of tendinosis, named after Fritz de Quervain
 De Quervain's thyroiditis, named after Fritz de Quervain